is a Japanese football player who plays for Thespakusatsu Gunma.

Club statistics
Updated to 23 February 2020.

References

External links

Profile at Thespakusatsu Gunma
Profile at Omiya Ardija

1985 births
Living people
Ryutsu Keizai University alumni
Association football people from Gunma Prefecture
Japanese footballers
J1 League players
J2 League players
J3 League players
Omiya Ardija players
Thespakusatsu Gunma players
Blaublitz Akita players
Association football goalkeepers